Erythrotrichiaceae is a red algae family in the order Erythropeltidales.

References

Red algae families
Compsopogonophyceae